Slukh — Ukrainian media about music and culture, founded in 2018. The site covers musical and cultural events in Ukraine and the world, tells about Ukrainian popular and little-known artists. The resource includes news, analytical texts, interviews, genre selections and thematic playlists. Also known for their own video content.

The co-founder and editor-in-chief is Maksym Serdiuk.

History
The history of the project dates back to 2014, when Maxim Serdiuk, a sophomore at the Institute of Journalism of Taras Shevchenko National University, joined the team of masters who develop publications on music "Muzmapa". It was a media about Ukrainian niche music. Subsequently, the participants decided to continue to improve the project. Over time, more and more people began to learn about this resource, and the Muzmapa team gradually became the Slukh team. As a result, the Muzmapa project was frozen.

In the interview, Maksym recalls: “We came on the initiative of the ticket service Concert.ua ... we met with the co-owner and marketing director of Concert.ua Dmytro Chin and decided to make a new story. That's how "Slukh" turned out.

The media launched on May 7, 2018. Together with the site, Slukh launched a YouTube channel with several shows of its own production. In 2019, the first documentary film produced by Slukh was released - "The Battle for Ukrainian Music: Between Betrayal and Victory"

In April 2020, at the beginning of the coronavirus pandemic, the media launched a series of online concerts called "Culture Unites". They were attended by Jamala, DaKooka, Palindrome, Zbaraski, alyona alyona and Вагоновожатые.

In December 2021, the team of online media Slukh together with the Ministry of Foreign Affairs of Ukraine and the Ukrainian Institute launched the official page of Ukraine in Spotify - Ukraine.ua.

«SPARK»
On November 25, 2020, the first series of the documentary series «СПАЛАХ» ("SPARK") about the new Ukrainian culture was released. Work on the series continued for almost all of 2020 with the support of the United States Agency for International Development (USAID).

More than 100 interviews were filmed for the documentary series, and its heroes and heroines were MONATIK, Yuri Bardash, Michael Schur, ONUKA, DakhaBrakha, Vladyslav Yama, Eugene Klopotenko, Antonio Lukich, Potap, Andriy Danilko, Leros Geo, Alan Badoev, Vivienne Mort, restaurateurs Dmytro Borisov, Misha Katsurin, founders of CLOSER, Veselka, Culture of Sound, Planet Cinema, Ukrainian Fashion Week, KSENIA SCHNAIDER and many other representatives of Ukrainian culture.

A total of ten series were released: about Ukrainian folk, comedy, rave culture, gastronomy, cinema, music videos, fashion, street art, dance culture and popular music. The last series was released on June 18, 2021.

After the series, the team continued the story in the format of the festival. The first took place on August 24, 2021, on the 30th anniversary of Ukraine's Independence.

References

Music websites
Ukrainian websites